Hemsworth is a town and civil parish in the City of Wakefield, West Yorkshire, England. Historically within the West Riding of Yorkshire and had a population of 13,311 at the 2001 census, with it increasing to 13,533 at the 2011 Census.

History

While Hemsworth's recent history and reputation are dominated by the coal mining industry that developed in the latter part of the nineteenth century, it had long existed as an agricultural village.

Hemsworth, meaning “Hymel’s enclosure” is mentioned in Domesday as  Hemeleswrde and in the twelfth century as Hymelswrde. Into the Middle Ages it was a township in the Wapentake of Staincross and is also thought to have been in the honour, or feudal barony, of Pontefract.

From the Middle Ages to Tudor times it would have seen little change to the manorial features, open fields, woods, commons, enclosed holdings, manor house, scattered farmsteads and the church, dedicated to St Helen, which dates to the eleventh or twelfth century. The present chancel was rebuilt in the fourteenth century.

A grammar school and a hospital, or almshouses, founded in the mid-sixteenth century owe their existence to Robert Holgate, thought to have been born in Hemsworth, who was consecrated Archbishop of York in 1544.

The school, established in October 1546 by letters patent granted by Henry VIII, did not thrive. At times there were complaints about the masters failing in their duties, which were to teach Latin, Greek and Hebrew to the sons of husbandmen in Hemsworth, Felkirk, South Kirby,  Ackworth, Royston and Wragby. There were periods in the eighteenth century when there were no pupils. A revival was attempted and a new school built and opened in January 1868. But it too failed to attract numbers and was moved to more populous Barnsley in 1888. The school buildings became the Roman Catholic Church, before they themselves were replaced in the 1990s.

The Archbishop Holgate almshouses, or hospital, still exist and still offer housing accommodation in a complex of 24 cottages for selected elderly people. Originally the endowment was for a master and ten poor men and ten poor women from the locality. The brothers and sisters wore gowns, were not permitted to frequent the ale-house, nor allowed out without permission later than half past nine in the summer or half past seven in the winter. A fine of twopence was levied for breaches. Being a common swearer, drunkard or brawler could lead to removal. The endowment, based on revenue from lands which Archbishop Holgate held, appeared in Holgate's will dated April 1555 and was carried into effect a year after he died in 1556. The total net assets of the modern-day charity which continues the work are £20.7 million.

Enclosure was brought about by an act of parliament in 1803, though it was not a revolutionary change. It ended the tithe system in kind and allocated common land to local landowners, particularly to Sir Francis Wood, and, less so, to Earl Fitzwilliam.

Economy
Hemsworth was a one-industry town, where coal mining employed the vast majority of residents, and the closure of the pits during the 1980s led to huge levels of unemployment and deprivation in the area. Hemsworth, along with nearby villages such as Ackworth, Fitzwilliam, Havercroft, Ryhill, South Elmsall and South Kirkby was made into a special regeneration area, and fortunes have improved as a result.

Also in Hemsworth is the Hemsworth Water Park, situated on the outskirts of Hemsworth. Hemsworth Water Park has two lakes; the largest lake is available for pedalo rides and has a man-made sandy beach; the smallest lake is in a more secluded area to attract wildlife. Both lakes are stocked for fishing which is available all year round. There are also plenty of grassed areas for picnics and games.

In the water park, there is also Playworld, an outdoor adventure playground, which is suitable for children of all ages with a tower slide, climbing frames, a toddlers' sandpit area and a miniature railway.

Politics
Hemsworth Town Council was formed under the provisions of the Local Government Act 1972 and came into existence on 1 April 1974, succeeding the former Hemsworth Urban District Council. Five wards of Hemsworth Town Council serve the town and the villages of Fitzwilliam and Kinsley. Three councillors serve on each ward—Hemsworth East, Hemsworth South, Hemsworth West, Fitzwilliam and Kinsley.

Three councillors represent Hemsworth, Ward 7, on Wakefield Metropolitan District Council.

The current Member of Parliament, Jon Trickett (Labour), has represented Hemsworth since a by-election in 1996. Trickett was most recently re-elected in December 2019 with a majority of 1,180, much reduced from the majority of 10,174 two years earlier. Labour's share of the vote was down from 56 per cent to 37.5 per cent.

Labour has represented the seat of Hemsworth since its creation in 1918, and from 1966 to 1974 held it with the largest majority of any party in the UK. From 1950 to 1974 Labour's share of the vote never dropped below 80 per cent. That it is now a marginal seat is regarded as partly due to the disappearance of the coal mining industry, the reorganisation of Conservative-voting areas of the southern part of Wakefield into the constituency in 2010 and the prominence of Brexit as an election issue in 2019. It is estimated that 68.1 per cent of the constituency voted leave in the EU referendum of 2016.

Population

Population estimates for the Hemsworth built-up-area for 2019 and 2001, broken down by age group, are:

In May 2005, the Office for National Statistics estimated that unemployment in Hemsworth was just 2.8%. This marks progress from periods in the previous two decades when it could reach as high as 50%.

Robert Holgate, a native of Hemsworth (1481?–1555) was consecrated Archbishop of York in January 1545.

Transport

Hemsworth lies at the crossing point of the Barnsley to Pontefract and the Wakefield to Doncaster roads. The junction where these roads cross, Cross Hill, is the heart of the original village, where the parish church and the George & Dragon inn still face each other. The A628 road, which forms the Barnsley to Pontefract road, bypasses Hemsworth to its south and east.

Stagecoach provides bus service 28 from Barnsley to Pontefract which serves Hemsworth's bus station.  Service 195, run by Arriva Yorkshire, links Hemsworth and Wakefield via Ryhill. The Upton to Wakefield services 496 and 497 call at Hemsworth bus station, as does service 36 run by Waterson bus and coach between South Elmsall and Barnsley.

The nearest railway station is in Fitzwilliam, the station at Hemsworth was closed in 1967.

Education
Primary schools in Hemsworth are St Helen's CE Primary School, Grove Lea Primary School and Sacred Heart Catholic Primary. The secondary schools are the West End Academy and the Outwood Academy Hemsworth, which was set up in 1921 as Hemsworth Grammar School, the first secondary school in Hemsworth after Archbishop Holgate school relocated to Barnsley in 1888.

Hemsworth had an FE college for many years. Hemsworth Mining and Technical college offered day release to mining apprentices as well as a range of other academic and vocational courses. It closed in the 1990s.

Media
The local weekly newspaper, the Hemsworth and South Elmsall Express, is edited by Gavin Murray and published by JPIMedia, the parent company of Yorkshire Post Newspapers and which also publishes The Scotsman and scores of local papers and websites.

The Barnsley Chronicle’s local news coverage also extends to Hemsworth.

Community radio station Rhubarb Radio launched in 2017, operated by volunteers. Based in Ossett, it broadcasts to the Wakefield district and south Leeds.

Notable people

Robert Holgate, Bishop of Llandaff from 1537 and Archbishop of York from 1545 to 1554, is thought to have been a native of Hemsworth.

Professional gambler and racehorse owner Phil Bull was born in Hemsworth in 1910.

World-class cricketer Geoffrey Boycott was born in nearby Fitzwilliam in 1940 and attended Hemsworth Grammar School.

Cromwell Bradley, footballer and minor counties cricketer.

See also
Listed buildings in Hemsworth

References

External links
 Parish of Hemsworth

 
Towns in West Yorkshire
Civil parishes in West Yorkshire
Geography of the City of Wakefield